The  ('Third Class') is the eighth tier of football in the Netherlands and the sixth tier of Dutch amateur football. The league is divided into 44 divisions, 20 played on Saturday and 24 on Sunday.

Each division consists of 14 teams. The champions are promoted to the Tweede Klasse, the teams finishing 13th and 14th are relegated to the Vierde Klasse. Each season is divided into a number of periods. The winner of these periods qualify for promotion playoffs, provided they finish in the top nine overall in the season. The teams finishing 12th in the final rankings play relegation playoffs.

Derde Klasse divisions

8